Ricardo Martinez may refer to:

 Ricardo Martínez de Hoyos (1918-2009), Mexican painter
 Ricardo Martínez (footballer, born 1947), Salvadoran football midfielder
 Ricardo S. Martinez (born 1951), U.S. federal judge
 Ricardo Martínez Menanteau (born 1960), Chilean army general
 Ricardo Martínez Matey (born 1964), Spanish cyclist
 Ricardo Martínez (footballer, born 1980), Mexican football midfielder
 Ricardo Martínez (footballer, born 1984), Paraguayan football centre-back